Sean O'Hagan is an Irish writer for The Guardian and The Observer, his specialty being photography.

Early life and education
O'Hagan was brought up in Armagh, Northern Ireland, during "The Troubles", and has written about the experience. As an undergraduate, he studied English in London.

Career
He began his media career as a writer for NME, The Face and Arena, and during this period became interested in photography. As of 2013, he is one of six regular "Art and design" critics for The Guardian website, and the only photography critic among the six.

O'Hagan is a nominator for the Prix Pictet Award in photography and sustainability.

The term "new lad" was coined by O'Hagan in a 1993 article about a young, brash and boisterous economist called David "Lad Lad Lad" Sturrock in Arena.

On 18 March 2003, O'Hagan received the 2002 British Press Award for Interviewer of the Year. In 2011, O'Hagan was the sole recipient of the J. Dudley Johnston Award from the Royal Photographic Society "for major achievement in the field of photographic criticism".

Publications with contributions by O'Hagan
Everything was Moving: Photography from the 60s and 70s. London: Barbican Art Gallery, 2012. . Edited by Kate Bush and Gerry Badger. O'Hagan contributes the essays "The unreal everyday: William Eggleston's America" and "Against detachment: Bruce Davidson's photographs of America during the Civil Rights Era".

Notes

References

External links
"The power of photography: Time, mortality and memory". The Guardian, 19 May 2013.
Links to articles (behind paywall) since 1984 by O'Hagan about music.
'Sean O’Hagan: "If you don’t annoy some people some of the time, you’re not doing your job properly!"' - interview with O'Hagan, 1000 Words Photography Magazine Blog, 2014.

 

20th-century births
Living people
Columnists from Northern Ireland
Irish music critics
Journalists from Northern Ireland
Magazine writers
Male non-fiction writers from Northern Ireland
People from Armagh (city)
Photography critics
The Guardian journalists